State Highway 227 (SH 227) is a state highway in Pueblo County, Colorado. SH 227's southern terminus is at U.S. Route 50 Business (US 50 Bus.) in Salt Creek, and the northern terminus is at SH 96 in Pueblo.

Route description
The highway begins at an interchange with US 50 Business as a continuation of Roselawn Road. As La Crosse Avenue, the route crosses the Arkansas River into the city limit of Pueblo. The route makes a left onto South Joplin Avenue, intersecting a BNSF railroad. After passing near Bradford Park, the designation terminates at SH 96. Joplin Avenue continues northward.

Major intersections

See also

 List of state highways in Colorado

References

External links

227
Transportation in Pueblo County, Colorado
Pueblo, Colorado